The Treaty of Melun was signed in April 1226 between Louis VIII of France and Joan, Countess of Flanders. 

Joan was forced into accepting the accord since her husband, Ferrand of Portugal, was captured by the French at Bouvines on 27 July 1214.

Based on the terms of the treaty, Ferrand and Joan were forced to swear their loyalty to Louis. Consequently, Flemish nobles, knights, and burghers had to take oaths of loyalty to the King of France, which included the understanding not to support the Count of Flanders if he were to betray the King. Also, no new castles were to be erected below the Scheldt. Lastly, Jeanne was forced to pay 50,000 livres in order to have her husband released from prison.

References

Sources

1226 in Europe
1220s in France
Melun
Melun